Martha Elena García Gómez (born 3 May 1945) is a Mexican politician affiliated with the PAN. She currently serves as Senator of the LXII Legislature of the Mexican Congress representing Nayarit. She also served as Deputy during the LXI Legislature.

References

1945 births
Living people
People from Oaxaca
Women members of the Senate of the Republic (Mexico)
Members of the Senate of the Republic (Mexico)
Members of the Chamber of Deputies (Mexico)
National Action Party (Mexico) politicians
21st-century Mexican politicians
21st-century Mexican women politicians
Women members of the Chamber of Deputies (Mexico)
Senators of the LXII and LXIII Legislatures of Mexico